Rowland Stanley Maxwell was an Anglican priest in  the twentieth century.

He was born in 1902 and educated at St John's College, Cambridge and St Stephen's House, Oxford; and ordained in 1930. After superfluous word  curacies in Notting Hill and Marylebone he was a Chaplain in the RAFVR from 1940 to 1946. He was Archdeacon of St Vincent from 1947 to 1962; and Archdeacon of Grenada from 1962 to 1973.

References

Alumni of St John's College, Cambridge
Alumni of St Stephen's House, Oxford
Royal Air Force Volunteer Reserve personnel of World War II
Royal Air Force chaplains
Archdeacons of St Vincent
Archdeacons of Grenada
1902 births
Year of death missing
World War II chaplains